Ashanti New Town, commonly known as Ashtown, is a suburb of Kumasi in the Ashanti Region of Ghana. The town featured prominently in Ghanaian news in 2012, when two people were fatally shot by unknown assailants.

References

Kumasi
Ashanti Region